West Park is a suburban area of Hartlepool, County Durham, in England. 
It is situated on the western fringes of Hartlepool.

Villages in County Durham